Louis-Jules André (24 June 1819 – 30 January 1890) was a French academic architect and the head of an important atelier at the École des Beaux-Arts.

Biography 
Born in Paris, André attended the École des Beaux-Arts and took the Prix de Rome in architecture in 1847, attending the Villa Medici in Rome from 1848 through 1852, with some time spent in Sicily and Greece.

His best-known work was probably carried out for the French National Museum of Natural History : the galerie de Zoologie ('Gallery of Zoology', since 1994 renamed as "Gallery of Evolution") in the Jardin des Plantes in Paris, a transitional work combining classical rhythms and ornamental details with cast-iron structure and a glass roof. Also for the French Museum of Natural History, André designed a large greenhouse, the first jardin d'hiver (winter garden) in the Jardin des Plantes. Inaugurated in 1889, this large greenhouse was demolished in 1934 and replaced on the same footprint by the current jardin d'hiver of the Jardin des Plantes, inaugurated in 1937 and designed by architect René-Félix Berger (1878-1954).

Among other honors André was a Commander of the Legion of Honor.

Atelier André 
The atelier André (the André workshop) produced some 500 students altogether, eight winners of the Prix de Rome, and even an alumni association founded in 1883 with 140 members.  The graduates included:

 Paul Bigot (1870–1942), French architect
 Louis Bonnier (1856–1946), French architect and urban planner
 Warren Richard Briggs (1850–1933), American architect
 Julien Guadet (1834–1908), French architect and theorist of architectural composition 
 Thomas Hastings (1860–1929), American architect, later of Carrère and Hastings.
 Victor Laloux (1850–1937), French architect who would in turn head the workshop after André's death
 Bernard Maybeck (1862–1957), American architect
 Emmanuel Pontremoli (1865–1956), French architect and archaeologist
 Henry Hobson Richardson (1838–1886), American architect (briefly)
 Guillaume Tronchet (1867–1959), French architect

References 

1819 births
1890 deaths
Architects from Paris
École des Beaux-Arts alumni
Academic staff of the École des Beaux-Arts
19th-century French architects
Prix de Rome for architecture
Members of the Académie des beaux-arts
Commandeurs of the Légion d'honneur
French expatriates in Italy